Muros is a municipality in the Spanish province of A Coruña in the autonomous community of Galicia. It is located in the comarca of Muros. It has a population of 10156 (Spanish 2001 Census) and an area of 73 km².

The town of Muros is an old harbour town whose traditional economy is based on fishing.

In the parish of Louro there are petroglyphs, as well as the Via Crucis, the monastery of San Francisco, and  about 20 beaches.

Demography 
From:INE Archiv

External links 
 Photo gallery of Muros and its surroundings. 

Municipalities in the Province of A Coruña